The 1997 Vuelta a Castilla y León was the 12th edition of the Vuelta a Castilla y León cycle race and was held on 4 August to 8 August 1997. The race started in Valladolid and finished in Aranda de Duero. The race was won by Ángel Casero.

General classification

References

Further reading

Vuelta a Castilla y León
Vuelta a Castilla y León by year
1997 in Spanish sport